Rosemary Margan (12 May 1937 – 5 December 2017) was an Australian television and radio personality. She won Logie Awards for best Victorian Female Personality in 1969 and 1970.

Biography

Margan became Well known for working with both Graham Kennedy and Bert Newton, she was the sister-in-law of radio presenter Neil Mitchell and regularly presented commercials on his morning program.

A soft and clear speaking voice and precise diction were her trademarks in both radio and television presentations.

Among her many TV appearances over a long and successful career, she had a brief but memorable cameo in the comedy/satire current affairs show Frontline (Series 1, Episode 13, "This Night of Night") where she played herself as a celebrity guest at the Logie Awards, who didn't know star presenter Mike Moore's name and merely called him "mate". 

She was the mother of actress Cathy Godbold.

References

1937 births
2017 deaths
Australian television personalities
Women television personalities